Leutnant Max Näther (24 August 18998 January 1919) HOH, IC, was a German World War I ace fighter pilot noted for the destruction of 26 enemy aircraft. He shot down 10 observation balloons and 16 airplanes, including 10 SPAD S.XIII fighters and a Sopwith Dolphin. He died in action at the border of Germany and Poland after the war's end on 8 January 1919.

Early life and army service
Max Näther was born on 24 August 1899 in Tepliwoda, Silesia, in what was then the eastern part of the Kingdom of Prussia and is now Poland. He joined the German army in 1914, at age 15. He was wounded twice before being commissioned as Leutnant der Reserve on 11 August 1916, just before his 17th birthday. He won both the Second and First Class Iron Crosses during this time, the latter on 1 February 1916. In the summer of 1917, he volunteered for transfer to the Air Service.

Aerial service
 

Näther took basic flight training in Bucharest. He then progressed to training with Fliegerersatz-Abteilung 7 (Replacement Detachment 7) at Brunswick. His final training was at Jastaschule I (Fighter Training School 1) in Valenciennes, France. He graduated from Jastaschule I  and was assigned to Jagdstaffel 62 (Fighter Squadron 62) on 31 March 1918. He flew an all black Albatros D.Va with a personal insignia of a German national flag streaming from a slanted staff imposed on a white square painted on the side of the plane's fuselage just aft of the cockpit.

Näther scored his first aerial victory on 16 May 1918, over a Spad XIII. Then, in June, he reeled off a string of six victories over enemy observation balloons between the 1st and the 28th, becoming an ace on the 16th. Balloons were well defended by surrounding anti-aircraft and nearby patrols of fighter planes, and attacks on them were considered near suicidal. He became Staffelführer (Commander) on 7 July 1918, just before his 19th birthday. Näther took leave from 28 July to 21 August; he probably waited to change planes to a Fokker D.VII until after his return.

In September, he was awarded the Knight's Cross with Swords of the Royal House Order of Hohenzollern. He scored another six victories in September, including two more balloons. He had a notable day on 26 September, when he downed a Spad S.XIII in the morning and a balloon and another Spad S.XIII in mid-afternoon. He was slightly wounded the following day. Näther began October with back to back double wins, on the 9th and 10th. After another victory on the 18th, he incinerated his tenth and final balloon on the 23rd. As he returned from this mission, Näther was shot down by Jacques Swaab, but survived a fiery crash-landing. His final three victories were scored on 29 October. Coincidentally, although he had become eligible with his 20th and 21st victories on 10 October, he was not nominated for the Pour le Mérite until 29 October. Näther's was one of several nominations that was not approved because of the war's end.

Näther's score of 26 victories comprised over half the wins for his entire squadron. In addition to burning ten observation balloons, he had destroyed 11 enemy fighters—ten SPAD S.XIIIs and a Sopwith Dolphin.

Postwar service and death
Näther died on 8 January 1919 during the Greater Poland uprising after World War I. He was killed by Polish ground fire flying over Kolmar in what was the Province of Posen (now Poland).

Notes

References
 Above the Lines: The Aces and Fighter Units of the German Air Service, Naval Air Service and Flanders Marine Corps, 1914–1918. Norman Franks, Frank W. Bailey, Russell Guest. Grub Street, 1993.  .
 Balloon-Busting Aces of World War 1. Jon Guttman, Harry Dempsey. Osprey Publishing, 2005. .
 Fokker D VII Aces of World War 1: Part 2. Norman Franks, Greg VanWyngarden, Harry Dempsey. Osprey Publishing, 2004. .
 SPAD XII/XIII Aces of World War I.  Jon Guttman. Osprey Publishing. Osprey Publishing, 2002. .

1899 births
1919 deaths
Aviators killed by being shot down
German World War I flying aces
Luftstreitkräfte personnel
People from the Province of Silesia
People from Ząbkowice Śląskie County
Prussian Army personnel